Whale sanctuary may refer to:

 Southern Ocean Whale Sanctuary, designated by the International Whaling Commission
 Indian Ocean Whale Sanctuary, designated by the International Whaling Commission